XHSAT-FM is a radio station on 90.1 FM in Villahermosa, Tabasco. The station is owned by Grupo ACIR and carries its MIX format.

History
While it was made available in 1976, XHSAT received its concession on June 6, 1986. It was originally owned by Sergio de la Torre Rangel, who was selected to win the station in 1980.

In 2000, XHSAT was acquired by Grupo ACIR.

References

Radio stations in Tabasco
Villahermosa
Grupo ACIR